Arthur Heber Browne (186410 June 1951) was the inaugural Bishop of Bermuda.

Born in 1864 and educated at St Edmund Hall, Oxford, he was ordained in 1887. After a curacy at Berkeley, Gloucestershire he was appointed the Vicar of Northleach in 1890. He then served the Anglican Church in Canada before a lengthy spell as Missioner within the Diocese of Exeter. His final post (before his appointment to the episcopate) was at the united parish of St Michael and All Angels with All Saints , Paddington. A colourful character, he died on 10 June 1951.

References

1864 births
1951 deaths
Alumni of St Edmund Hall, Oxford
20th-century Anglican bishops in Bermuda
Anglican bishops of Bermuda